Andris Vaņins (born 30 April 1980) is a Latvian former professional footballer who works as a goalkeeping coach for Swiss club FC Sion. A goalkeeper, he most notably played for Sion, making over 200 league appearances. At international level, he earned 100 caps for the Latvia national team.

Club career

Ventspils
Vaņins started his professional football career in 1997, when he was only 17 years old. His first club was FK Ventspils. In 2003, he left the Virsliga, signing a contract with FC Torpedo-ZIL Moscow.

FC Moscow
In 2003 Vaņins signed a contract with FC Moscow. He could not manage to get into the first team, mostly being used in the reserves. As playing for the reserve team did not please the Latvian international, he decided to leave.

FK Venta
In 2005, Vaņins returned to Latvia. FK Venta offered him a contract, which Vaņins accepted. He did not play much there either and the club went bankrupt in the second half of the season. The first-team players, including Vaņins, were released.

Return to Ventspils
Having become a free agent, Vaņins agreed to a contract with FK Ventspils. He became the first-choice goalkeeper at the club and played there for three and a half years. In 2006, 2007 and 2008 he was named the best goalkeeper of the season in the LMT Virslīga, as well as the Latvian Footballer of the Year in 2008. In 2009, he started looking for a club abroad, but eventually he had to start the next season with FK Ventspils, because of unsuccessful negotiations. In February 2009 he went on trial with the Russian Premier League club Rubin Kazan.

Sion
In the middle of FK Ventspils' season Vaņins joined Swiss Super League club FC Sion on a three-year contract. He went on to become first-choice goalkeeper. His debut for the club was on 19 August 2009 in a 2–0 loss against Fenerbahçe. His first clean sheet came against FC Echallens. He was named the best goalkeeper of the league after the first and the second round. In his first season at FC Sion Vaņins played in all of the games and was named the club's best player of the season. The Swiss portal sport.ch named him the best goalkeeper of the Swiss Super League of the 2009–10 season. After the 2010–11 season Vaņins was again named the club's best player by the team's fans, who gave him 34% votes in a survey via Facebook. After the 2011 season he was also named the best goalkeeper of the season in the "Swiss Golden Player Award" ceremony. In October 2013, Vaņins' contract at the club was extended till June 2017.

FC Zürich
On 17 June 2016, Vaņins was signed by FC Zürich on a three-year contract. He made his league debut for the club on 25 July 2016 in a 2–0 home victory over FC Winterthur playing the full 90 minutes. In July 2020 his contract was not renewed.

International career
Vaņins made his international debut for Latvia in 2000 in a 3–1 loss against Slovakia. In summer 2007, when the first-choice keeper Aleksandrs Koliņko suffered a long-term injury, head coach Aleksandrs Starkovs faced a choice to either let Vaņins or Deniss Romanovs play. Vaņins was chosen to be the replacement, and since then he has become the first-choice goalkeeper of the team. On 10 October 2019, Vaņins played his 100th match for Latvia in a 3–0 loss against Poland.

Post-playing career
On 31 August 2020, Vaņins retired from playing and returned to Sion as a goalkeeper coach.

Personal life
Andris Vaņins is married and has two sons.

Honours
Ventspils
 Virsliga: 2006, 2007, 2008
 Latvian Cup: 2007

Sion
 Swiss Cup: 2010–11, 2014–15

FC Zürich
 Swiss Cup: 2017–18
 Challenge League: 2016–17

Latvia
 Baltic Cup: 2008, 2012

Individual
 Virsliga Best Goalkeeper: 2006, 2007, 2008
 Latvian Footballer of the Year: 2008, 2013, 2015, 2016, 2017
 Swiss Super League Best Goalkeeper: 2009–10, 2010–11
 FC Sion Player of the Season: 2009–10, 2010–11, 2011–12, 2012–13

See also
 List of men's footballers with 100 or more international caps

References

External links
 
 
 FC Zurich Stats

1980 births
Living people
People from Ilūkste
Latvian footballers
Association football goalkeepers
Latvian expatriate footballers
Latvia international footballers
Expatriate footballers in Russia
Latvian expatriate sportspeople in Russia
Expatriate footballers in Switzerland
FK Ventspils players
Latvian Higher League players
FC Moscow players
FC Sion players
FC Zürich players
Swiss Challenge League players
Swiss Super League players
FK Venta players
Latvian people of Ukrainian descent
Ilūkstes NSS players
FIFA Century Club